The Battle of Montepeloso was fought on 3 September 1041 between Lombard-Norman rebel forces and the Byzantine Empire, near Montepeloso in southern Italy. The Byzantines, led by Exaugustus Boioannes, were forced into battle by the rebels, and after a day-long fight the rebels defeated the Byzantine army and captured Boioannes. The decisive rebel victory forced the Byzantines to retreat to the coastal cities, leaving the Normans and Lombards in control of the whole interior of southern Italy.

Background
The battle of Montepeloso was part of a Lombard-Norman revolt against the Byzantine Empire in southern Italy, with preceding battles at Olivento in March, and at Montemaggiore in May, both rebel victories. Before the battle, the Normans and Lombards agreed on choosing Atenulf, brother of Pandulf III of Benevento, as their new leader, while the Byzantine Catepan Michael Dokeianos was replaced by Exaugustus Boioannes.

The new overall leader of the revolt, Atenulf, was part of the ruling Beneventan family and a rival to the Norman sponsor Guaimar IV of Salerno, but although the rebel army was led by Norman military leaders, the Normans could not yet afford to break with their Lombard allies.

Battle
After the battle of Montemaggiore, Boioannes made an attempt to lay siege to Melfi, which had been captured by the rebels. In response, the Normans and Lombards counter-attacked Boioannes' camp at Monte Siricolo, near Montepeloso (modern Irsina) on the Bradano river. The Byzantine army under Boioannes had been safe within the stronghold of Montepeloso, but as the rebels wanted to avoid the strains associated with a siege, they forced the Byzantines and the Varangian Guard into battle by stealing their cattle. The battle went on to last most of the day with intense fighting, but the Norman cavalry, led by William Iron Arm, managed to secure a decisive victory for the rebels. Boioannes was captured by the rebels during the battle and held for ransom.

Aftermath
The rebel victory forced the Byzantine army to retreat to the coastal cities, leaving the entire interior of southern Italy to the Norman and Lombard rebels. Following the victory, the town of Matera switched its support to the revolt, while the coastal cities Bari, Monopoli and Giovinazzo relinquished their allegiance to the Byzantine Empire in order to avoid Norman raids.

After the battle, the rebel leader Atenulf was sent back home after it was found that he had kept the money received for Boioannes ransom for himself. Although the Norman knights pushed for the next leader to be a Norman, they were in the end outvoted by the Lombards and had to settle for Argyrus from Bari.

The battle of Montepeloso was the last pitched battle fought between Normans and Byzantines in the Italian peninsula.

References

Sources

1041 in Europe
1040s in the Byzantine Empire
Montepeloso
Montepeloso
Montepeloso
Montepeloso
Catepanate of Italy
Montepeloso
Battles in Basilicata